Duke is a 2019 American crime drama film directed by and starring Anthony and James Gaudioso and also starring Carmine Giovinazzo and Hank Harris.

Cast
Carmine Giovinazzo as Dare
Hank Harris as Roost
Michael Monks as Collins
Anthony Gaudioso as Morrison
Lesley-Ann Brandt as Violet
James Gaudioso as Joan 'J-Bird'
Michael Irby as Evelio
Michael Bowen as Sgt. Roman
Carmen Argenziano as Lt. Brannigan
Richard Portnow as Carroll Green
Richard Roundtree as J.T.
Vanessa Ferlito as Cookie
Maurice Benard as Winky

Release
The film was released in Houston on February 19, 2019.

Reception
Joe Leydon of Variety gave the film a positive review, calling it "an uneven but arresting indie thriller about two siblings who are driven to heroic extremes by childhood traumas."

References

External links
 
 

2010s English-language films